European route E85 is part of the International E-road network, which is a series of main roads in Europe.

The E 85 starts from Klaipėda (Lithuania) runs south through Belarus, Ukraine, Romania, Bulgaria to Greece, ending at Alexandroupoli.

Route 

: Klaipėda  - Kryžkalnis - Kaunas - Vilnius
: Vilnius
: Vilnius - Šalčininkai

: Beiniakoni - Lida - Slonim - Ivatsevichy
: Ivatsevichy (Start of Concurrency with ) - Kobryn (End of Concurrency with )

: Domanove - Kovel - Dubno - Ternopil - Chernivtsi - Porubne

: Siret - Suceava - Săbăoani - Roman - Bacău - Tișița - Focșani - Buzău - Urziceni (Start of concurrency with ) - București (End of concurrency with )
: București (Start of concurrency with ) - Giurgiu

: Ruse (End of Concurrency with )
: Ruse - Byala - Veliko Tarnovo - Stara Zagora - Dimitrovgrad - Haskovo
: Haskovo - Harmanli - Novo Selo

: Ormenio - Orestiada - Didymoteicho - Likofos - Ardani
: Ardani - Alexandroupolis

See also 
Danube Bridge

External links 

 UN Economic Commission for Europe: Overall Map of E-road Network (2007)

 
E085
E085
E085
E085
European routes in Ukraine
Roads in Greece